Nogometni klub Portorož Piran, commonly referred to as NK Portorož Piran or simply Portorož Piran, is a Slovenian football club from Piran. The club was founded in 1998. The club is legally not considered to be the successor of NK Piran and the statistics and honours of the two clubs are kept separate by the Football Association of Slovenia. They play their home games at Pod Obzidjem Stadium.

Honours

Slovenian Fourth Division
 Winners: 2005–06, 2009–10

References

Association football clubs established in 1998
Football clubs in Slovenia
1998 establishments in Slovenia